Green frog may refer to various frogs worldwide:

 Pelophylax, a true frog genus in the family Ranidae found in the Old World
 Specifically, the edible frog (P. kl. esculenta), the most common Pelophylax of Europe
 Lithobates clamitans, a true frog species in the family Ranidae of North America that also includes the subspecies bronze frog
 Litoria aurea, a Hylidae ("true tree frog") species of Australia, also known as green and golden bell frog, green bell frog or green and golden swamp frog
 Green Frog Hybrid Bus, a bus company in the Philippines that consists of the country's first hybrid electric buses in their fleet

See also
Green Toad (disambiguation)

Animal common name disambiguation pages